Konio is a village and seat (chef-lieu) of the rural commune of Dandougou Fakala in the Cercle of Djenné in the Mopti Region of southern-central Mali.

The market that is held in the village on Saturdays serves many settlements in the surrounding region.

References

Populated places in Mopti Region